Kump is a surname. Notable people with the surname include:

Edna Hall Scott Kump (1887–1957), former First Lady of West Virginia
Ernest J. Kump (1911–1999), American architect, author, and inventor
Heimo Kump (born 1968), Austrian football manager and former player
Herman G. Kump (1877–1962), American politician
Larry Kump (born 1948), American politician
Marko Kump (born 1988), Slovenian cyclist
Peter Kump (1937–1995), American figure in the culinary arts

See also
Gov. H. Guy Kump House